Ramasubbu Sankararamakrishnan is an Indian computational biologist, bioinformatician and a professor at the Department of Biological Sciences and Bioengineering of the Indian Institute of Technology, Kanpur. He is known for his computational studies on membrane protein function. The Department of Biotechnology of the Government of India awarded him the National Bioscience Award for Career Development, one of the highest Indian science awards, for his contributions to biosciences in 2008.

Biography 

R. Sankararamakrishnan, who completed his early college education at the Madurai Kamaraj University in 1986, did his doctoral studies at the Indian Institute of Science and after obtaining a PhD in 1992, he moved to the UK where he did his post-doctoral research in computational biology at the University of Oxford. He had another stint of post-doctoral work at the University of Illinois, Urbana-Champaign and started his career in 1996 as an instructor (later assistant professor of research) at the Icahn School of Medicine at Mount Sinai. In April 2002, he returned to India to join the Indian Institute of Technology, Kanpur (IITK) as an assistant professor and serves as a professor at the Department of Biological Sciences and Bioengineering (BSBE). Subsequently, he founded the Bioinformatics and Biomolecular Simulation Laboratory at IITK where he hosts several research scholars. He also serves as a resource person for the Centre for Mathematical Biology of the Department of Science and Technology.

Legacy 
Sankaramakrishnan's research is focused on mechanism of membrane protein function using computational approaches. He is known to have carried out research on aquaporin genes in plants, Asx turns, molecular dynamic simulations of protein-protein interactions, GPCR peptide hormones as well as nonAUG start codons and AUG codons. His studies have been documented by way of a number of articles and ResearchGate, an online repository of scientific articles has listed 98 of them. Besides, he has also contributed chapters to books published by others and his articles have drawn many citations. He is the co-author of MIPModDB, a database of structure models of Major intrinsic proteins. He has also delivered invited or keynote speeches at various national and international seminars.

Sankararamakrishnan is a member of the National Network for Mathematical and Computational Biology, an agency funded by the Science and Engineering Research Board of the Government of India for promoting scientific research and advanced training in the discipline. He is also a life member of the National Academy of Sciences, India, one of the three major Indian science academies.

Awards and honors 
The Department of Biotechnology of the Government of India awarded him the National Bioscience Award for Career Development, one of the highest Indian science awards in 2008. He has also held the Joy Gill Chair Professorship for Young Faculty and the U.S.V. Chair Professorship of the Indian Institute of Technology, Kanpur during 2007-2010 and 2011-2014 respectively.

Selected bibliography

Chapters

Articles

See also 

 Kozak consensus sequence
 Molecular dynamics

Notes

References

Further reading

External links 
 
 

N-BIOS Prize recipients
Indian scientific authors
Living people
Indian computational chemists
Computational biology
Scientists from Madhya Pradesh
Madurai Kamaraj University alumni
Indian Institute of Science alumni
Icahn School of Medicine at Mount Sinai faculty
Alumni of the University of Oxford
University of Illinois Urbana-Champaign alumni
Academic staff of IIT Kanpur
Indian bioinformaticians
Year of birth missing (living people)